Coral Sea Ferry Service Company Limited also known as Coral Sea Ferry is a ferry transport company in Hong Kong. It was established in 1992 and took over the Sam Ka Tsuen - Sai Wan Ho route from Hongkong and Yaumati Ferry. Coral Sea Ferry has since expanded its business to three routes.

Routes
 Sai Wan Ho←→Sam Ka Tsuen
 Sai Wan Ho←→Kwun Tong
 Sam Ka Tsuen←→Joss House Bay/Tung Lung Chau

Fleet

 M.V. Coral Sea 8
17.5M wooden kai-to ferry, operates on Sam Ka Tsuen - Tung Lung Chau route. 
 M.V. Coral Sea 8A
17.5M wooden kai-to ferry, operates on Sai Wan Ho - Kwun Tong route.
 M.V. Coral Sea 18
17.5M wooden kai-to ferry, operates on Ping Chau - Hei Ling Chau - Mui Wo route. 
 M.V. Coral Sea 18A
17.5M wooden kai-to ferry, operates on Sai Wan Ho - Sam Ka Tsuen route.

External links

 Franchised and Licensed Ferry Services, Hong Kong Transport Department
 Company website

Ferry transport in Hong Kong
Victoria Harbour
Transport operators of Hong Kong